Oluseyi Ashaolu (born April 18, 1988) is a Nigerian-Canadian basketball player. A  power forward, Ashaolu played college basketball at Louisiana Tech and Oregon.

College career
Ashaolu lived in Brampton until 2004, when he made the move to Atlanta for grade 9, to play high school basketball stateside.

Ashaolu began his collegiate career at Louisiana Tech, where he averaged 5.3 points and 4.3 rebounds per game as a freshman. He improved those numbers to 10.7 points and 8.1 rebounds per game as a sophomore. Ashaolu averaged 14.2 points and 9.4 rebounds per game as a junior. He earned his bachelor's degree in business administration in 2011 and decided he did not want to be part of the rebuilding effort under rookie head coach Michael White.

On May 24, 2011, Ashaolu announced his transfer to Oregon, choosing the Ducks over Texas, San Diego State and Xavier. Ashaolu took advantage of the graduate transfer rule and did not have to sit out the season as a redshirt. One of the reasons he joined Oregon was because his AAU teammate, Devoe Joseph, was on the squad. Ashaolu was relegated to a bench role as a senior, but did not mind the decreased minutes. He averaged 9.2 points and 5.2 rebounds per game in his only season at Oregon.

Professional career
Following the close of his college career, Ashaolu was not drafted in the 2012 NBA draft. However, he did sign with the Milwaukee Bucks in the 2012 Summer League. On August 22, 2012 he signed with Cáceres Ciudad del Baloncesto of the Spanish league. He was picked up by Hamamatsu Higashimikawa Phoenix of Japan's bj league in 2014. After helping Hamamatsu capture a title in May 2015, Ashaolu joined Osaka Evessa.

Ashaolu signed with the Phoenix, now renamed San-en NeoPhoenix, in August 2016. The following season, he moved to the Sendai 89ers. Ashaolu averaged 18.5 points and 7.6 rebounds per game but was hampered by a knee injury in November 2017.

He signed with the NLEX Road Warriors of the Philippine Basketball Association in June 2018. Despite having a 70-percent tear on his knee, Ashaolu played through pain and scored 27 points against NorthPort Batang Pier. In August 2018, NLEX signed Aaron Fuller as his replacement to allow time for his injury to heal.

On June 28, 2019, Olu Ashaolu debuts for the Road Warriors as he replaced Tony Mitchell as the team's import. Ashaolu recorded 26 points, 13 rebounds and 6 assists as he led the Road Warriors in their second win of the Commissioner's Cup as they beat the Rain O'Shine Elasto Painters.

On June 30, 2020, Ashaolu signed with the Fraser Valley Bandits of the Canadian Elite Basketball League (CEBL). On May 17, 2021, Ashaolu signed with Niagara River Lions of the CEBL.

In November 2021, Ashaolu signed with the Alaska Aces for his third stint in the Philippine Basketball Association. On March 15, 2022, he was replaced by Mark St. Fort as the team's import for the quarterfinals of the 2021 PBA Governors' Cup as chronic injuries bothered Ashaolu for the whole conference.

References

External links
 NBADraft.net profile

1988 births
Living people
Alaska Aces (PBA) players
Basketball people from Ontario
Black Canadian basketball players
Canadian expatriate basketball people in the Philippines
Canadian expatriate basketball people in South Korea
Canadian men's basketball players
Canadian sportspeople of Nigerian descent
Fraser Valley Bandits players
Goyang Carrot Jumpers players
Guelph Nighthawks players
Louisiana Tech Bulldogs basketball players
Niagara River Lions players
Nigerian men's basketball players
Nigerian emigrants to Canada
NLEX Road Warriors players
Oregon Ducks men's basketball players
Osaka Evessa players
Philippine Basketball Association imports
Power forwards (basketball)
San-en NeoPhoenix players
Sendai 89ers players
Sportspeople from Brampton
Sportspeople from Lagos
St. John's Edge players